National Route 135 is a national highway of Japan connecting Shimoda and Odawara in Japan, with a total length of 94.4 km (58.66 mi).

References

135
Former toll roads in Japan
Roads in Kanagawa Prefecture
Roads in Shizuoka Prefecture